The 2014 Iowa gubernatorial election took place on November 4, 2014, to elect the Governor of Iowa. Republican incumbent Terry Branstad ran for reelection to a sixth overall and second consecutive four-year term. Branstad went on to win a historic sixth term as governor by defeating Democratic challenger and State Senator Jack Hatch, and on December 14, 2015, he became the longest-serving governor in American history. He won 59.1% of the popular vote to Hatch's 37.3%, and carried every county in the state except Johnson, home to Iowa City and the University of Iowa.

Republican primary

Candidates

Declared
 Terry Branstad, incumbent Governor
 Tom Hoefling, political activist and America's Party and American Independent Party nominee for president in 2012

Polling

Results

Democratic primary
Narcisse was disqualified from appearing on the ballot in the Democratic primary following a ruling by the Iowa Supreme Court that upheld a lower court decision that held that Narcisse had not submitted enough valid signatures to be placed on the ballot for the primary election. Narcisse continued his campaign and declared his intention to run for the nomination as a write-in candidate. When he was unsuccessful, he announced that he would be running in the general election as the nominee of the Iowa Party.

Candidates

Declared
 Jack Hatch, state senator
 Jonathan Narcisse, former member of the Des Moines School Board and Iowa Party nominee for governor in 2010

Withdrew
 Paul Dahl, bus driver, retail sales associate, former librarian and candidate for Iowa's 5th congressional district in 1994
 Tyler Olson, state representative and former chairman of the Iowa Democratic Party

Declined
 Frank Cownie, Mayor of Des Moines
 Chet Culver, former governor
 Jeff Danielson, state senator
 Michael Fitzgerald, state treasurer
 Michael Gronstal, majority leader of the Iowa Senate and chairman of the Democratic Legislative Campaign Committee
 Fred Hubbell, insurance executive
 Pam Jochum, president of the Iowa Senate
 Bob Krause, former state representative, nominee for state treasurer in 1978, candidate for Mayor of Waterloo in 1982 and candidate for the U.S. Senate in 2010
 Janet Petersen, state senator
 Tom Vilsack, United States Secretary of Agriculture and former governor

Endorsements

Results

General election

Candidates
 Terry Branstad (Republican), incumbent governor
 Running mate: Kim Reynolds, incumbent lieutenant governor
 Jack Hatch (Democratic), state senator
 Running mate: Monica Vernon, Cedar Rapids City Councilwoman
 Jim Hennager (New Independent Party), administrator, former city councillor and Reform Party nominee for governor in 1998
 Running mate: Mary Krieg
 Lee Hieb (Libertarian), orthopedic surgeon
 Running mate: Ryan Ketelsen, businessman
 Jonathan Narcisse (Iowa Party), former member of the Des Moines School Board and nominee for governor in 2010
 Running mate: Michael Richards, semi-retired businessman

Debates
Complete video of debate, September 20, 2014 - C-SPAN

Predictions

Polling

}
With Branstad

With Hoefling

With Reynolds

Results

References

External links
 Iowa gubernatorial election, 2014 at Ballotpedia

Official campaign websites (Archived)
 Terry Branstad for Iowa Governor
 Paul Dahl for Iowa Governor
 Jack Hatch for Iowa Governor
 Tom Hoefling for Iowa Governor

Gubernatorial
2014
2014 United States gubernatorial elections